Plato Tiburtinus ("Plato of Tivoli"; fl. 12th century) was a 12th-century Italian mathematician, astronomer and translator who lived in Barcelona from 1116 to 1138. He is best known for translating Hebrew and Arabic documents into Latin, and was apparently the first to translate information on the astrolabe (an astronomical instrument) from Arabic.

Plato of Tivoli translated the Arab astrologer Albohali's "Book of Birth"  into Latin in 1136.  He translated Claudius Ptolemy's Tetrabiblos from Arabic to Latin in 1138, the astronomical works of al-Battani, Theodosius' Spherics and the Liber Embadorum by Abraham bar Chiia.
He has worked together with the Jewish mathematician Savasorda (Abraham Bar Ḥiyya Ha-Nasi). His manuscripts were widely circulated and were among others used by Albertus Magnus and Fibonacci.

Works
To him are attributed four works in science-mathematics:
The Liber Embadorum (“Book of Areas,” or “Practical Geometry”), it was transferred (after a date astronomical specified in the text ) in 1145 from the Hebrew. The book had an influence on the Geometry of Fibonacci book and contains one of the first comprehensive treatments of quadratic equations in the Occident.
The Spherica by Theodosius of Bithynia,
Al-Battān,i’s al-Zij (“Astronomical Treatise”)
The De usu astrolabii of Abu’l-Qāsim Maslama (Ibn al-Sạffār), The manuscript contains information about the first astrolabe in the West.
The translations from the Arabic of seven other works (five astrological, one geomantical, and one medical [now lost]) are ascribed to Plato:
Ptolemy’s Quadripartitum,
The Iudicia Almansoris,
The De electionibus horarum of Ali ibn Aḥmad al-Imrani,
The De nativitatibus or De iudiciis nativitatum of Abu 'Ali al-Khaiyat,
The De revolutionibus nativitatum by Abū Bakr al-Ḥasan (Albubather),
The Questiones geomantice or Liber Arenalis scientie by “Alfakini, son of Abizarch” or “son of Abraham”,
A De pulsibus et urinis by “Aeneas”.

See also
Latin translations of the 12th century

Notes

Further reading
 Baldassarre Boncompagni: Delle versioni fatte da Platone Tiburtino. Atti dell’ Accademia pontificia dei Nuovi Lincei, 4, 1851, S. 249–286
 F. J. Carmody: Arabic Astronomical and Astrological Sciences in Latin Translation: A Critical Bibliography. Berkeley, Los Angeles 1956
 Charles Homer Haskins: Studies in History of Medieval Science. Cambridge, Massachusetts 1924
 Charles Homer Haskins: The Renaissance of the Twelfth Century. Cambridge: Harvard University Press 1927
 George Sarton: Introduction to the History of Science. Band 2, Teil 1, Baltimore 1931, S. 177–179
 Moritz Steinschneider Die Europäischen Übersetzungen aus dem Arabischen bis Mitte des 17. Jahrhunderts. Graz 1956
 Moritz Steinschneider: Abraham Judaeus: Savasorda und Ibn Esra … In: Zeitschrift für Mathematik und Physik. Band 12, 1867, S. 1–44

External links

Translators
Article in the Dictionary of Scientific Biography by Lorenzo Minio-Paluello

People from Tivoli, Lazio
12th-century Italian mathematicians
Hebrew–Latin translators
Arabic–Latin translators
Christian Hebraists
12th-century astronomers
12th-century translators
Medieval Italian astronomers